Get Guilty is A.C. Newman's second solo album, released on January 20, 2009, on Matador Records/Last Gang Records. The album was recorded during the summer of 2008 at Brooklyn's Seaside Lounge and produced by Newman and Phil Palazzolo. The first single from the album was "The Palace at 4 AM."

The album received favorable reviews upon its 2009 release, and was sometimes described as a natural continuation of Newman's work with The New Pornographers. Guest musicians include Jon Wurster (Superchunk/ The Mountain Goats), Mates of State, and vocalist Nicole Atkins.

Track listing
 "There Are Maybe Ten or Twelve" – 2:40
 "The Heartbreak Rides" – 4:09
 "Like a Hitman, Like a Dancer" – 3:40
 "Prophets" – 2:58
 "Submarines of Stockholm" – 3:54
 "Thunderbolts" – 3:45
 "The Palace at 4 AM" – 3:22
 "The Changeling (Get Guilty)" – 3:19
 "Elemental" – 3:28
 "Young Atlantis" – 3:49
 "The Collected Works" – 3:09
 "All of My Days and All of My Days Off" – 3:51
 "You've Got to Be Kidding Me" (bonus track on iTunes Store version of the album)

References

External links
 A.C. Newman's website

2009 albums
A. C. Newman albums
Matador Records albums
Last Gang Records albums
Albums produced by A. C. Newman